Matuail Adarsha High School is an academic institution in West Matuail, Jatrabari Thana of Dhaka, Bangladesh. It was established in 1985. It is a kindergarten and a higher secondary school.  The school has a scouting club and a reading society.

It is located in Matuail, near Mridhabari bus stand, on the outskirts of the capital city. The Dhaka–Chittagong and Dhaka-Sylhet highways run through it. The Government Primary High School (no-2) and Matuail Sub post office are situated beside it.as we see the school. 
The land was donated by akkas Mollah for the school. the Mollah family donate this land in 1985.

Infrastructure
It has a two-storied administration building, a six-storied and a two-storied academic building. In 2011 the school opened up a new playground for the students. A new six-storied admin-cum-academic building was completed in 2014. As the school has almost 1,500+ students spanned from playgroup to class X, there are three shifts each day to accommodate the students in the classrooms.

Education level
The school runs programs from primary to secondary level:
 Primary Level: (from play group to level 5)
 Lower Secondary Level: (from level 6 to level 8)
 Secondary Level: (from level 9 to level 10) Every Thursday afternoon and Friday morning learners come to learn music, traditional folk song, classical Bengali song. Bulbul Academy for Fine Arts (BAFA) runs a program in the school to protect the local culture.

School committee
The school runs through an administration  committee and a group of 51 teachers. The chairman of Matuail Union Parishad (UP) Alhaj Nasir Uddin Mia is a founding member of the school.

Headmaster- 
Mr. Lutfur Rahman Mollah. (2005–present)

References

High schools in Bangladesh
Schools in Dhaka District
Educational institutions established in 1985
1985 establishments in Bangladesh